Arecibo Light is a historic lighthouse located in the city of Arecibo, Puerto Rico. It is also known as Los Morrillos Lighthouse because of its location on top of a rocky headland known as Punta Morrillos. The lighthouse was constructed and was lit in 1898. This was the last lighthouse built by the Spanish government on the island.

The original lens was a third-order Fresnel, with an  radius. The lighthouse was converted to electric power in 1931. Currently, it has a 190 mm lens with a white flash every five seconds.

After the light was automated in 1964, the unmanned structure fell victim to decay and vandalism.  The Fresnel lens was damaged in 1975 and destroyed in 1977.

A private company completed the restoration of the lighthouse in 2001. It has been operated as a foundation until the present. The lighthouse is called the Arecibo Lighthouse and Historical Park that includes a replica of a Taino Indian Village, a replica of the Niña, Pinta and Santa Maria, a Slavery Quarters, a replica of a Pirate Ship, a Pirate Cave, a Mini Zoo, various Salt Water Aquariums, a Playground, and a Water Park. The lighthouse is home to a small museum showcasing marine artifacts, the history of the lighthouse, and the Spanish–American War.

This lighthouse should not be confused with the Cabo Rojo lighthouse, known as Faro de Los Morrillos de Cabo Rojo.

Gallery

See also
 List of lighthouses in Puerto Rico

References

 
 Puerto Rico lighthouses. Lighthouses Friends

External links
Arecibo Lighthouse and Historical Park

Lighthouses completed in 1898
Historic American Engineering Record in Puerto Rico
Lighthouses on the National Register of Historic Places in Puerto Rico
Maritime museums in Puerto Rico
Neoclassical architecture in Puerto Rico
1898 establishments in Puerto Rico
National Register of Historic Places in Arecibo, Puerto Rico